James O'Donnell Quinn (1906 – ??) was a Scottish-born miner and political figure in British Columbia. He represented Rossland-Trail in the Legislative Assembly of British Columbia from 1948 to 1949 as a Co-operative Commonwealth Federation (CCF) member.

He came to Canada, settling in Trail, British Columbia. Quinn was elected to the provincial assembly in a 1948 by-election held following the death of James Lockhart Webster. He was defeated by Alexander Douglas Turnbull when he ran for reelection in 1949.

References 

1906 births
Year of death missing
British Columbia Co-operative Commonwealth Federation MLAs
20th-century Canadian politicians
British emigrants to Canada
Place of birth missing